The Hateful Eight is the soundtrack album to Quentin Tarantino's motion picture The Hateful Eight. The soundtrack includes the first complete original score for a Tarantino film and is composed, orchestrated and conducted by Ennio Morricone. Morricone composed 50 minutes of original music for The Hateful Eight.

The Hateful Eight was the composer's first score for a Western film since Buddy Goes West (1981) and the first for a Hollywood production since Ripley's Game (2002). The score features notable horror references including Morricone's repurposed score from John Carpenter's The Thing (1982) and "Regan's Theme" from The Exorcist II, which serve the sinister mood.
 
In addition to Morricone's music, the album includes three songs which are featured in the film; The White Stripes' "Apple Blossom" (2000), David Hess' "Now You're All Alone" (1972) (originally from The Last House on the Lefts soundtrack) and Roy Orbison's "There Won't Be Many Coming Home" (1966), as well as dialogue clips from the film. The trailer used the instrumental version of the song "Same Ol'" from The Heavy.

The soundtrack won a Golden Globe and Academy Award for Best Original Score on 28 February 2016.

The opening track, "L’ultima diligenza di Red Rock" (Versione Integrale), was released as a single online on December 15, 2015. In December 2016, it gained a nomination for a Grammy Award for Best Instrumental Composition for Mr. Morricone.

Background 
Tarantino originally wanted Morricone to compose the soundtrack for Inglourious Basterds. However, Morricone refused because of the sped-up production schedule of the film. He also turned down an offer to write some music for Pulp Fiction in 1994.

Tarantino previously used Morricone's music in Kill Bill, Death Proof, Inglourious Basterds, and Django Unchained, and Morricone also wrote an original song, "Ancora Qui", sung by Elisa, for the latter.

Morricone had previously made statements that he would "never work" with Tarantino after Django Unchained. The composer stated Tarantino used the music “without coherence” and that he "wouldn’t like to work with him again, on anything". Ennio Morricone quickly released a statement clarifying that his remarks were taken out of context,  Morricone said that he has "great respect for Tarantino" and that he is "glad he chooses my music". Morricone also said that because Tarantino chooses his music "it is a sign of artistic brotherhood".

Ultimately Morricone changed his mind and agreed to score The Hateful Eight.

On June 12, 2015, Quentin Tarantino held court at Italy's 59th David di Donatello Awards in Rome, which he attended to collect prizes from several years back for Pulp Fiction and Django Unchained. Tarantino was handed two statuettes by Ennio Morricone. Both artists revealed that they met a day earlier and that Morricone agreed to compose music for a Tarantino movie. In July 2015, Quentin Tarantino announced after the screening of footage of his upcoming movie The Hateful Eight at the San Diego Comic-Con International that Ennio Morricone will score the film, the first Western Morricone has scored since 1981.

Recording process 
Morricone supplied music largely inspired by The Hateful Eight'''s screenplay. The music is moody, tension-building work with music box nods to the Italian Giallo genre.

The recording sessions began on July 18 at the Czech National Symphony Orchestra ’s studio "soundtrust" in Hostivař, Prague. Morricone previously conducted the orchestra CNSO for his soundtrack to Giuseppe Tornatore’s The Best Offer (2013) and during his 60th Anniversary Tour. Quentin Tarantino was also present during the 3-day recording sessions to supervise the work.

In an August 2015 interview with Vulture, when Tarantino was asked how Morricone's score sounded, he joked, "It's horrible. What do you expect me to say?...You'll hear it when you see it. It's absolutely abysmal. No, there’s no whistling in this score."

In a September 2015 interview with Dutch television broadcaster AVROTROS, Morricone stated that he did not want to repeat himself: "Can I repeat for Tarantino what I've done for Sergio Leone? It's not possible, right? It would be absurd. It would make Tarantino's movie look hideous, because that music is old, you see. I had to write it in another way. But I have written very important music for him. I don't know if he directly realized that, or if the others did. They didn't expect that music, that's why they didn't understand it. But he told me, after he had listened to it twice: it's ok, I like it. But at first it had been a shock. He had expected something completely different. But I didn't give that to him, because I didn't want to give him something he knew already."

 Track listing 

All tracks composed, orchestrated, and conducted by Ennio Morricone, except where noted:

Film music not included on the album

 "Regan's Theme (Floating Sound)"—Ennio Morricone (from Exorcist II: The Heretic (1977))
 "Eternity"—Ennio Morricone (from The Thing (1982))
 "Silent Night"—Demián Bichir
 "Ready for the Times to Get Better"-Crystal Gayle (exclusively used in the Roadshow for the opening of Chapter 4 - Domergue's Got a Secret)
 "Bestiality"—Ennio Morricone (from The Thing)
 "Despair"—Ennio Morricone (from The Thing'')

The film's trailer used Welshly Arms' cover of "Hold On, I'm Coming", although this is not used in the film itself.

For Your Consideration track listing 

As with all awards seasons, a For Your Consideration album leaked online, featuring a number of differences from the general release album.

Personnel 

Score composed, orchestrated, conducted and produced by Ennio Morricone.

 Czech National Symphony Orchestra: orchestra
 Jan Hasenöhrl: trumpet
 Fabio Venturi: recording and sound mix
 Dusan Mihely: orchestra coordinator

Accolades

Charts

References 

2015 soundtrack albums
Ennio Morricone soundtracks
Decca Records soundtracks
2010s film soundtrack albums
Scores that won the Best Original Score Academy Award